Galileo Academy of Science and Technology, formerly known as Galileo High School, is a public high school located between the Russian Hill and Marina District neighborhoods of San Francisco, California. The school is a part of the San Francisco Unified School District.

About Galileo
Galileo Academy is located in the historic north end of San Francisco, and was originally built in 1921. As of May 2015, Galileo has more than 150 faculty & staff members and serves more than 1,800 students. It is one of two Bay Area schools with an observatory. The observatory at Galileo is not in use at this time. Plans for restoration are in progress. (The other school with an observatory is Prospect High School in Saratoga, part of the Campbell Union High School District.) Galileo received the 2005 California Distinguished School Award along with the 2005 CTE Award - one of the very few schools that were awarded this.

The lion is the official mascot of Galileo. In sports and other inter-school activities the team members are known as the Galileo Lions. The official school colors are purple and orange. The school is commonly known as "Gal" or "G-House". Galileo has an internal television network, G-House TV, which is broadcast by students of the Media Arts Pathway. The Media Arts Pathway (MAP) works on all media-related works while AoIT concentrates on computer science related works. The school motto is Eppure si muove (Italian: And yet it moves). As the story goes, Galileo Galilei was told to deny his scientific findings that the earth moved, or be punished - so he did as he was ordered. But on his way out he mumbled to himself, "And yet it moves."

Mission Statement
Galileo Academy of Science and Technology's mission is to provide equal access to all educational programs and ensure success for all students. The programs offered to students both challenge and support students to achieve high levels of academic achievement while preparing each graduate to be successful in college, work, and life.

History
On December 10, 1920, Major Joseph P. Nourse, who had been actively engaged in educational work in the city for many years, became the first principal of Galileo High School. Throughout the summer, carpenters were busy converting the Red Cross Building, located on Fulton Street near the Civic Center. On August 1, 1921, Galileo High School welcomed its student body into the remodeled facilities. The ceremony of "breaking ground" for the new building was on November 4, 1921, and the dedication of the Van Ness Building on March 30, 1924. At the same time, plans were underway for a new wing which would double the school's capacity.

In the 1920s, the Galileo High School building was considered an outstanding example of modern architecture. Planned with the intention of housing one of the best educational institutions in the country, it was equipped to offer the highest type of academic curriculum in addition to training in commercial and technical branches.

During the 1970s, Galileo went through an extensive refit where most, if not all, student facilities were moved across the street onto Fort Mason. Before this, there were rumors that the Galileo campus would be permanently moved onto the Fort Mason site. Though the student population, then, did not indicate whether the move and larger facilities would be justified, the land that Galileo sits on was quite valuable, which could have made the move plausible.

Since the 1995-96 school year, Galileo has transformed itself to the Galileo Academy of Science and Technology. The new program provides students with career pathways and academies. These include the Galileo Health Academy, the Academy of Information Technology (AoIT), Biotechnology Pathway and the Environmental Science Pathway. In 2006-2007, the Publications Pathway was introduced and, in 2007-2008, the Academy of Hospitality and Tourism (AoHT) and Digital Photography Pathway.

On September 25, 2007, while some construction workers were digging the courtyard, they found a time capsule which was thought to be lost forever by the Class of 1982. It was uncovered that day, but was filled with water, as well as a yearbook, a frisbee, a Rubik's Cube and a Mighty Lion T-shirt. It was buried shortly after the class of '82 graduated, but, in 1997, a search for the time capsule over every square foot of the courtyard turned up nothing. The time capsule is now stored in one of the closets in the building.

On October 31, 2007, the courtyard partially reopened with a ribbon-cutting ceremony by the ASB officers, followed by a celebration and a contest. The courtyard did not fully open until November, as there was still more maintenance work required.

Statistics

Demographics

Standardized Testing

Academies and Pathways
Students in their sophomore, junior and senior years can participate in one of the five career pathways or academies. In small learning communities, students choose to take a particular elective class that is paired with one or two core academic classes. Biotechnology is paired with English; Health with English; AOIT with English and Social Studies; and AOHT with Math. In addition to the academies and pathways, students can choose to be in the Chinese Immersion program or in the Advancement Via Individual Determination (AVID) program. Both programs are integrated into their school day, and are 4-year long programs.

Schedule
Galileo has two regular hour schedules with 5-minute passing period (Monday, Tuesdays, and Fridays end at 3:50PM), two early-leave days with 5-minute passing period (Wednesdays and Thursdays end at 2:50PM, staff until 3:50PM), and two block period days with homeroom and 5-minute passing periods (Wednesdays with 1st, 3rd, and 5th periods; Thursday with 2nd, 4th, and 6th periods and dismissal at 2:50PM).

Starting in 2021, a modified schedule was implemented, pushing the school starting time from 8:00AM to 8:40AM and dismissal from 3:10PM and 2:10PM to 3:50PM and 2:50PM for regular hour schedule and block period days respectively.

Location
The school is located at 1150 Francisco Street, San Francisco, CA
(Aerial View)

Galileo is located in far northern San Francisco, in the Russian Hill neighbourhood near Fort Mason.

Muni bus service is plentiful in the vicinity, with direct access to 6 bus routes, and various others in the area. Less than half of the students reside near the school, but school buses and special buses on the 28-19th Avenue are provided by the Municipal Railway. Special bus service exclusively serves students in SFUSD, and only drops off passengers. The 19-Polk, 30-Stockton, and 49-Van Ness/Mission also serve nearby, but have no special runs.

Facility

Internal features
4-story Western Wing
5-story Eastern Wing
Observatory (Closed)
4 computer laboratories
In-house TV studio
3 gymnasiums
Dance studio
Fitness lab
TRX Training Station
Schoolwide surveillance
Schoolwide Wi-Fi Coverage

External features
Courtyard
3 basketball courts
Football field
Roof garden
Underground Bay Street Tunnel (Connecting the main and Bay Street Gymnasium buildings)
Parking Lot

Junior Reserve Officers' Training Corps program
The Junior Reserve Officers' Training Corps battalion at Galileo is an Honor Unit with Distinction, the highest designation a unit may have. Its afterschool teams are very competitive, often highly placed in the annual fall and spring competitions. Fall teams consist of the Guidon, Squad Drill, Color Guard and Drill Platoon while Spring teams include Drum Corps, Silent Drill Team and Exhibition Drill Team. Other competitions occur during the last week of school at Camp Parks. This consists of cadet challenge and various other sporting events.

The program was disbanded in 2018, though reinstated the following school year under new leadership due to outcry and support for the program.

American football
Largely due its alumnus O. J. Simpson, Galileo was well known for its American football team. Galileo's arch enemy is reputed to be the Eagles of George Washington High School, though the Cardinals of Lowell High School have been a rising challenge.

The football field that dominates the second block of Galileo was formerly named in honor of O. J. Simpson. However, after Simpson's trial for murder in 1995, the football field was renamed George White Field. The two twin apartment buildings that face the northern side of the football field are the Fontana buildings, which were supposedly built to echo and magnify the sounds of the football games.

Galileo's football team has had three undefeated seasons throughout the school's history. In 1988, the Lions defeated McAteer High School becoming the first football team in San Francisco history to go 12–0. The second undefeated season was in 1990 and the third was in 2002 when the Lions defeated the Washington Eagles.

From the end of the 2006 season through the first game of the 2009 season, Galileo had an 18-game losing streak, going winless in both 2007 (0–7) and 2008 (0–9). After losing the first game of the 2009 season, the Lions won 9 out of their final 11 games, punctuated by a 35–0 win over the Lincoln High School Mustangs in the San Francisco AAA Turkey Bowl, capturing their 16th city championship. Lincoln had won 4 consecutive AAA championships in a row prior to the 2009 season from 2005-2008. It was Galileo's 16th San Francisco AAA championship overall.

Four years later in 2013, the Lions (led by quarterback Kyle Nelson and running back Ronzel Fox) prevailed once again over the Lincoln High Mustangs in the AAA-Turkey Bowl by a score of 34–30. It was Galileo's record 17th city championship.

In 2017, Galileo won the school's 18th city championship and advanced to the state playoffs. The Lions beat the Rio Vista High Rams in the Northern California championship and the Vincent Memorial Scots in the State championship. It was the first state football championship for any San Francisco AAA school.

Reputation
Galileo previously had a bad reputation for low test scores and criminal events occurring in school, but in more recent years it has become one of the most improved schools in San Francisco (see Academic Performance Index below). Since the installation of surveillance cameras in 2005, criminal acts at Galileo have declined as a serious issue. Math scores remain one of Galileo's best academic strengths.

In 2008, Gerald Courtney, the Assistant Principal at the time, was charged in a prostitution ring. Courtney was accused of helping operate two brothels in San Jose. No minors, school officials or students from the San Francisco Unified School District were involved in the operation, police said. Police also believe Courtney posted advertisements for the prostitution business on online forums.

The Galileo Observer is the quarterly newsletter for the alumni.

Galileo Songs
"Hail, Galileo, Hail" is the Hymn of Galileo Academy of Science & Technology.

Other songs include The Galileo Fight Song, The Big G, and The Lion's Whisper. They are usually performed by the Galileo Cheerleaders or “Lioness”. 
The songs are also performed at Song and Yell, an annual rally that takes place near the beginning of each school year.

Notable alumni

Johnny Aguirre, Canadian football player
Joe Angel, '65 sports commentator
Peter Arnautoff, soccer player.
Howard Bach, '96 badminton player
Roy Barni, football player
Roger Boas, politician, class of 1938
Ping Bodie, baseball player
Barbara Bouchet, actress, class of 1962
 London Breed, Mayor of San Francisco, class of 1992
 Bobby Brown, baseball player, American League President, class of 1942
Italo Chelini, baseball player
Raymond Chow, mobster
 Gino Cimoli, baseball player, class of 1947
 Theodore J. Conway, United States Army four-star general, class of 1927
 Al Cowlings, football player, class of 1965
 Frank Crosetti, baseball player
 Dom DiMaggio, baseball player
 Joe DiMaggio, baseball player, dropped out
Vince DiMaggio, baseball player, dropped out
Oscar Donahue, football player
 Arthur Dong, filmmaker, class of 1971
Joe Drake, football player
Patricia Elsener, Olympic diver
Art Garibaldi, baseball player
 Theodore Geballe, physicist, class of 1937
 Richard Goldman, co-owner of San Francisco Giants, co-founder of Goldman Prize, class of 1937
 Peter E. Haas, owner Levi Strauss & Co, class of 1935
 Walter A. Haas, Jr., owner Levi Strauss & Co. and owner Oakland Athletics, class of 1932
Bruce Hale, basketball player
Ruth Heller, author
 Stan Johnson, baseball player, class of 1956
Grover Klemmer, USA National Champion and NFL official, class of 1939
 Him Mark Lai, Archivist and historian of Chinese America, class of 1943
Fred H. Lau, former chief of police for San Francisco
Tony Lazzeri, baseball player, dropped out
 Bill Lee, author, class of 1972
Lawson Little, golfer
 Dario Lodigiani, baseball player, class of 1934
Frank Lucchesi, former Major League Baseball manager, class of 1944
 Hank Luisetti, basketball player, class of 1934
Milton Marks, Sr. state senator, class of 1937
Gilbert Milam Jr, rapper, dropped out
Kyle Nelson, MLB pitcher for the Cleveland Indians
 Andre Nickatina, rapper, dropped out
John Orofino '41 World War II Hero – 3rd Army, U.S. Cavalry – Operation Overlord
Gloria Panicucci, violinist, class of 1944
Marty Passaglia, basketball player, class of 1937
Marino Pieretti, baseball player
George Puccinelli, baseball player
 Dino Restelli, baseball player
 John Santos, musician, bandleader, class of 1973
Fred Scolari, basketball player
 Bobby Shaw, football player, class of 1993
 Pat Sheehan, actress and Playboy Playmate of October 1958, class of 1949
 O. J. Simpson, football player, class of 1965
Norm Thompson, football player
 Dave Toschi, police detective, known for his role as a chief investigator in the Zodiac Killer case
 Vince Tringali, football player, class of 1946
Lenny Walls, '97 Basketball/Football
 Joan Weldon, actress, class of 1947 
Gene Williams, basketball player
 Walt Williams, baseball player, class of 1963
Zaytoven, music producer

Academic Performance Index (API)
This system has discontinued and is now being replaced by the School Quality Improvement Index (SQII)

Comparison by years (Galileo)

Comparison with other San Francisco high schools (2013)

See also

San Francisco County high schools

References

External links

 Galileo Academy website
 Galileo Sports website
 Galileo Football website
 Galileo Alumni Association

Educational institutions established in 1921
Public high schools in San Francisco
1921 establishments in California
San Francisco Unified School District schools